Colonești is a commune in Olt County, Muntenia, Romania. It is composed of nine villages: Bărăști, Bătăreni, Cârstani, Chelbești, Colonești, Guești, Mărunței, Năvârgeni and Vlaici.

Natives
Alexandru Șerbănescu (1912–1944), fighter pilot and flying ace in World War II.

References

Communes in Olt County
Localities in Muntenia